Ma Gui may refer to:

Ma Gui (general) (1543–1607), Ming Dynasty general
Ma Gui (martial artist) (1847/51–1941), master of the Chinese martial art of Baguazhang